Statist individualism is an ideology which pushes for an alliance between state and individual. The ideology's basic tenet is the idea that strong state and individual freedom are not mutually exclusive, but that state interference can strengthen personal autonomy. The term was coined by the historians Henrik Beggren and Lars Trägårdh in 2006.

The concept is mainly used in the context of Sweden. While being of the most advanced welfare states in the world, Sweden is far from collectivist. The Swedish welfare policies and Family Law are aimed at liberating people from dependence on family, church and private charities.

Critique on statist individualism 
In the 2015 documentary The Swedish Theory of Love, the Italian-Swedish director Erik Gandini shows the dark side of statist individualism: alienation and loneliness.

See also 
 Individualism
 Statism
 Social democracy

References 

Political ideologies